Álvaro Jardón (born 1977), Spanish bassist
Dante Jardón (born 1988), Mexican professional boxer
Dorothy Jardon (1883–1966), American soprano and actress
Henri-Antoine Jardon (1768–1809), French general of brigade